Paglasthan is a locality in Bongaigaon, surrounded by the localities of Mayapuri, Bongaigaon, Borpara, Bongaigaon and Chapaguri, Bongaigaon. The nearest railway station is at New Bongaigaon, near China Market.

Commercial importance
Paglasthan is a major commercial area with various malls and shops such as the Prakash Mega Mart and Milan Shoppe.

Recreational facilities
A multiplex theater called Mayapuri Cinema and many restaurants including Nandini Restaurant and Ram Bharosa provide entertainment for this area.

See also
 Mayapuri, Bongaigaon
 Borpara, Bongaigaon
 Chapaguri, Bongaigaon
 Dhaligaon
 New Bongaigaon

Neighbourhoods in Bongaigaon